Headshots: Se7en (stylized as Headshots: SE7EN) is a mixtape by American hip hop duo Atmosphere. Recorded between 1997 and 1999, it was released only on cassette in 1999. It was re-released in 2005.

Track listing

Charts

References

External links
 

1999 albums
Atmosphere (music group) albums
Rhymesayers Entertainment compilation albums